Luke Gifford (born August 28, 1995) is an American football linebacker for the Tennessee Titans of the National Football League (NFL). He played college football at Nebraska.

Early years
Gifford attended Lincoln Southeast High School, where he was a two-way player as a tight end and safety. As a sophomore, he contributed to the team winning the 2011 state championship. As a junior, he received second-team All-Nebraska honors. As a senior, he was named the starting quarterback.

He accepted a football scholarship from University of Nebraska with the intention of playing safety, but was converted into a linebacker.

As a redshirt freshman, he appeared in 6 games, tallying 7 tackles (one for loss) before suffering a season-ending hip injury. As a sophomore, he appeared in 4 contests as a backup, making only one assisted tackle.

As a junior, he appeared in 7 games as a starter at outside linebacker, registering 39 tackles (5 for loss) and 1.5 sacks, until suffering a season-ending hip injury. As a senior, he appeared in all 12 contests, posting 62 tackles, 13 tackles for loss (led the team), 5.5 sacks (led the team), 7 quarterback hurries and one forced fumble.

Professional career

Gifford was signed by the Dallas Cowboys as an undrafted free agent after the 2019 NFL Draft on April 30. He suffered a left high ankle sprain in the first preseason game against the San Francisco 49ers, after making one interception, one tackle and one pass breakup. Even though he was injured, the Cowboys protected his player rights by keeping him on the regular season roster. He returned to action in Week 6 against the New York Jets and was focused on playing special teams. In Week 15 against the Los Angeles Rams, Gifford suffered a fractured left arm while covering a punt return and was ruled out for the remainder of the season. He was placed on injured reserve on December 17. He appeared in 6 games and was declared inactive for 8 contests during the season.

In 2020, he appeared in 8 games, playing mostly on special teams. He was declared inactive for the season opener with a hamstring strain. On November 24, he was suspended two games by the NFL for violating the league's policy on performance-enhancing drugs, forcing him to sit in Week 12 and Week 13. Although he was reinstated from suspension on December 9, the club opted to declared him inactive for 2 additional games. He finished second on the team with 7 special teams tackles.

On March 21, 2022, Gifford re-signed with the Cowboys on a one-year contract.

References

External links
Dallas Cowboys bio
Nebraska Cornhuskers bio

1995 births
Living people
Sportspeople from Lincoln, Nebraska
Players of American football from Nebraska
American football linebackers
Nebraska Cornhuskers football players
Dallas Cowboys players